Computerra was a Russian computer weekly publication. The first edition was released on December 21, 1992 and was published by C&C Computer Publishing Limited (Computerra Publishing House). Later, it received the online counterpart at [www.computerra.ru], which supplements the contents of the publication; due to the financial problems and lack of advertisement material, the issue 811–812 on December 15, 2009 was announced as the last issue to be published offline, with only the online version remaining active. The last issue cover lacks a usual cover image, with only the black rectangle instead and the words roughly translatable as "now you can shut down your computerra", as a pun on the shutdown image of Windows 95.

The founder was Dmitriy Mendrelyuk. The magazine was headquartered in Moscow. There are some other magazines founded by him like Business-Journal.

The typical audience of Computerra magazine includes the working men 25–34 years old, who have high social status, high or medium income level, and use computers.

The difference of Computerra from the most of other computer magazines is that this magazine not only writes about computer hardware and software, but writes philosophical thoughts about life, "computer people" life above all.

Alexa.com traffic rank for Computerra.ru official website is 36,816 .

History 
Editors-in-chief:
 Georgiy Kuznetsov (1995–1998)
 Eugene Kozlovsky (1998–2004)
 Sergey Leonov (2004–2006)
 Dmitriy Mendrelyuk (temporary in 2006)
 Vladimir Guriev 2007–2008
 Vladislav Biryukov

References

External links
 Computerra website
 old Computerra website
 archive
 Computerra Inside  – editorial blog

1992 establishments in Russia
2009 disestablishments in Russia
Computer magazines published in Russia
Defunct computer magazines
Defunct magazines published in Russia
Magazines established in 1992
Magazines disestablished in 2009
Magazines published in Moscow
Online magazines with defunct print editions
Russian-language magazines
Weekly magazines published in Russia